Micropterix renatae is a species of moth belonging to the family Micropterigidae that was described by Michael A. Kurz, Marion E. Kurz and Hans Christof Zeller-Lukashort in 1997. It is known from the Ligurian Alps, as well as the northern Apennine Mountains (the provinces of Liguria, Tuscany and Emilia-Romagna).

The habitat consists of edges of dense, deciduous shrubland and tall herb vegetation.

References

Micropterigidae
Endemic fauna of Italy
Moths described in 1997
Moths of Europe